Herb Matthews may refer to:

Herb Matthews Sr. (1894–1964), Australian rules footballer for South Melbourne, Richmond and Melbourne
Herbie Matthews (1913–1990), son of Herb, Australian rules footballer for South Melbourne
Herb Matthews Jr. (born 1943), son of Herbie, Australian rules footballer for Melbourne and South Melbourne